Defending champion Henry Slocum defeated Quincy Shaw in the Challenge Round, 6–3, 6–1, 4–6, 6–2 to win the men's singles tennis title at the 1887 U.S. National Championships. Shaw defeated Oliver Campbell in the All Comers' Final, 1–6, 6–4, 6–3, 6–4. The event was held at the Newport Casino, Newport, R.I. from 21 August to 28 August.

Draw

Challenge round

Finals

Earlier rounds

Section 1

Section 2

References

 

Men's Singles
1889